Cesar Delgado Rios (born 16 January 1977) is a former Mexican footballer who played for Kansas City Wizards in the MLS. He was waived after playing in one game: a 4–0 away loss at Dallas Burn. Very little information is known about Delgado. He was signed by the Wizards following both of their goalkeepers sustaining injuries before the 1999 season. In the first game of the MLS season, he started, making 4 saves but allowing 4 goals in a 0–4 loss. The next day in training, it is reported that he didn't train with the team because he had to watch tape of the game for all of training. He was waived soon after. Information beyond this is hard to come by and even as much as his jersey number in the game that he played in is unsure but is assumed to be 1. It is known that he attended and played college soccer for Yavapai College.

Career statistics

Club

Notes

References

1978 births
Living people
Mexican footballers
Mexican expatriate footballers
Association football goalkeepers
Yavapai Roughriders men's soccer players
Sporting Kansas City players
Major League Soccer players
Expatriate soccer players in the United States
Mexican expatriate sportspeople in the United States
Footballers from Guadalajara, Jalisco